Elizabeth DePalma Digeser is a historian of Christianity who is a faculty member at the University of California, Santa Barbara. Her work focuses on late antiquity.

Works

The Rhetoric of Power in Late Antiquity: Religion and Politics in Byzantium, Europe and the Early Islamic World, ed. with Justin Stephens and R. M. Frakes. London: I. B. Tauris, 2010 (Bloomsbury).
(ed. with R. M. Frakes) Religious Identity in Late Antiquity (Toronto: Edgar Kent, 2006)

References

Living people
University of California, Santa Barbara faculty
Historians of Christianity
Historians of ancient Rome
21st-century American historians
21st-century American non-fiction writers
21st-century American women writers
Year of birth missing (living people)